Glenn Ramsay (born January 20, 1935 in Sault Ste. Marie, Ontario) is a former professional ice hockey goaltender who played 19 seasons in the IHL (1956–74). Ramsay is a six-time winner of the James Norris Memorial Trophy, which was awarded by the IHL to the goaltender with the fewest goals allowed during the regular season.

Ramsey played 945 regular season games and 63 playoff games in the IHL. He also played 9 games in the AHL with the 	Springfield Indians during the 1965–66 AHL season.

External links

1935 births
Living people
Canadian ice hockey goaltenders
Cincinnati Mohawks (IHL) players
Des Moines Oak Leafs players
Fort Wayne Komets players
Ice hockey people from Ontario
Omaha Knights (IHL) players
Port Huron Flags players
St. Paul Saints (IHL) players
Sportspeople from Sault Ste. Marie, Ontario
Springfield Indians players
Toledo Blades players
Toledo Hornets players
Toledo Mercurys players
Troy Bruins players
Canadian expatriate ice hockey players in the United States